Nurkozha Kaipanov is a Kazakhstani freestyle wrestler. He is a silver medalist at the World Wrestling Championships and a two-time gold medalist at the Asian Wrestling Championships.

Career 

In 2019, he won the gold medal in the men's 70 kg event at the Asian Wrestling Championships held in Xi'an, China. At the 2019 World Wrestling Championships held in Nur-Sultan, Kazakhstan, he won the silver medal in the men's 70 kg event. In the same year, he also won the silver medal in the men's 74 kg event at the 2019 Military World Games held in Wuhan, China.

In 2021, he won one of the bronze medals in the 74 kg event at the Matteo Pellicone Ranking Series held in Rome, Italy. He competed in the 74kg event at the 2022 World Wrestling Championships held in Belgrade, Serbia.

Achievements

References

External links 
 

Living people
Kazakhstani male sport wrestlers
World Wrestling Championships medalists
Asian Wrestling Championships medalists
1998 births
People from Petropavl
Islamic Solidarity Games competitors for Kazakhstan
21st-century Kazakhstani people